Henry Jackson Jr. (December 12, 1912 – October 24, 1988) was an American professional boxer and a world boxing champion who fought under the name Henry Armstrong.

Armstrong was one of the few fighters to win in three or more different divisions: featherweight, lightweight, and welterweight. He defended his welterweight title a total of nineteen times.

The Ring magazine named him Fighter of the Year in 1937. The Boxing Writers Association of America (BWAA) named him Fighter of the Year in 1940. He is currently ranked by BoxRec as the 12th-greatest pound-for-pound fighter of all time. In 2007, The Ring ranked Armstrong as the second-greatest fighter of the last 80 years. Historian Bert Sugar also ranked Armstrong as the second-greatest fighter of all time. ESPN ranked Armstrong as number 3 on their list of the 50 greatest boxers of all time. He was posthumously inducted into the International Boxing Hall of Fame in the inaugural class of 1990. In 2019, the International Boxing Research Organization (IBRO) ranked him as the second best boxer of all time, pound for pound, as well as the second-best featherweight, third-best welterweight, and fifth-best lightweight of all time.

Early life
He was born Henry Jackson, Jr. on December 12, 1912, in Columbus, Mississippi. He was the son of Henry Jackson Sr., a sharecropper of African American descent and America Jackson, said to be a "full-blooded" Iroquois. As a child, Henry Jr. moved with his family to St. Louis, Missouri, during the early period of the Great Migration of African Americans from the rural South to industrial cities of the Midwest and North. There he became involved in boxing. He graduated as an honor student from Vashon High School in St. Louis Later he took the surname Armstrong as his fighting name.

Early career
Armstrong began his professional career on July 28, 1931, in a fight with Al Iovino, in which Armstrong was knocked out in three rounds. His first win came later that year, beating Sammy Burns by a decision in six. In 1932, Armstrong moved to Los Angeles, where he lost two four-round decisions in a row to Eddie Trujillo and Al Greenfield. Following these two losses, however, he started a streak of 11 wins.

In 1936, Armstrong split his time among Los Angeles, Mexico City and St. Louis. A few notable opponents of that year include Ritchie Fontaine, Baby Arizmendi, former world champion Juan Zurita, and Mike Belloise. Early in his career, he fought some fights under the ring name Melody Jackson.

In 1937 alone, Armstrong went 27–0 (26KO). Aldo Spoldi was the only opponent to take him the full 10 rounds. He kayoed Baby Casanova in three rounds, Belloise in four, Joe Rivers in three, former world champion Frankie Klick in four, and former world champion Benny Bass in four. Armstrong was given his first world title fight, for the title in the 126-pound weight class against World Featherweight Champion Petey Sarron at Madison Square Garden. Armstrong knocked Sarron out in six rounds, becoming the World Featherweight Champion.

Armstrong's two nicknames were Hurricane Henry and Homicide' Hank.

In 1938, Armstrong started his season with seven more knockouts in a row, including one over Chalky Wright, a future world champion. The streak finally ended when Arizmendi lasted ten rounds before losing a decision to Armstrong in their fourth fight. Armstrong's streak of 27 knockout wins in a row qualifies as one of the longest knockout win streaks in the history of boxing, according to The Ring magazine.

Later in 1938, Armstrong, still the Featherweight division world champion, challenged Barney Ross for the title. Later a fellow member of the three division champions' club, Ross was then World Welterweight Champion. Armstrong, at  pounds, beat Ross, at 142 pounds, by unanimous decision, adding the World Welterweight Championship to his belt. Armstrong lost weight in order to compete in the lower weight division, and beat World Lightweight Champion Lou Ambers by split decision. Armstrong was the first boxer ever to hold world championships in three different weight divisions at the same time. He decided not to maintain the required 126-pound weight anymore and left the featherweight crown vacant.

Welterweight defenses
Armstrong dedicated the next two years to defending the welterweight crown, beating, among others, Ceferino Garcia, a future World Middleweight Champion, and Bobby Pacho.

Armstrong defended his Lightweight belt in a rematch with Ambers, which he lost on a 15-round decision. After that, he concentrated once again on defending the world Welterweight title. He defended it in eight fights in a row, the last of which was a nine-round knockout win over Puerto Rico's Pedro Montañez.

Armstrong sought to become the first boxer to win world titles in four different categories in a rematch with Garcia, already the World Middleweight Champion, but the fight ended in a ten-round draw. Armstrong's attempt to win a world title in a fourth division was frustrated. According to boxing historian Bert Sugar, many commentators of the time said that Armstrong deserved the decision in this fight.

Returning to the welterweight division, Armstrong successfully defended the title five more times, until Fritzie Zivic beat him to take the world title in a 15-round decision. This ended Armstrong's reign as Welterweight Champion. Armstrong's eighteen successful title defenses were the most in history in the Welterweight division.

In 1945, Armstrong retired from boxing. His official record was 152 wins, 21 losses and 9 draws, with 101 knockout wins.

After boxing
After retiring from boxing in 1946, Armstrong briefly opened a Harlem nightclub, the Melody Room (named after his first nickname). He returned to settle again in St. Louis, Missouri where, apart from the ceremonies and galas that he attended afterward, he led a quiet retirement. He became a born-again Christian and an ordained Baptist minister and youth advocate, helping to run the Herbert Hoover Boys Club. He also taught young fighters how to box. In February 1966, Rev. Armstrong appeared on the TV game show I've Got a Secret with his simultaneous triple championship as his secret.

Honors

1937, The Ring magazine named him as Fighter of the Year. 
1940, the Boxing Writers Association of America (BWAA) named him as Fighter of the Year. 
In 1954, Armstrong was inducted into The Ring magazine Boxing Hall of Fame the year it was established. 
In 1987, he was among those inductees from The Ring  list who were absorbed into the International Boxing Hall of Fame when it was established. 
In 1995, Armstrong was posthumously honored for his boxing career by being inducted into the St. Louis Walk of Fame.
In 2007, The Ring magazine ranked Armstrong as the second-greatest fighter of the last 80 years.
In 2007, ESPN ranked Armstrong as number 3 on their list of the 50 greatest boxers of all time.

Professional boxing record

See also
Lineal championship
List of boxing triple champions

References

External links

 
 The story of his life is retold in the radio drama "The Saga of Melody Jackson", a presentation from Destination Freedom

 The Official Henry Armstrong Web Site 
 Henry Armstrong Foundation Web Site
 Biographical sketch for Henry Armstrong on the International Boxing Hall of Fame (IBHOF) web site
 
 National Boxing Association's Quarterly Ratings: 1938 – BoxRec
 National Boxing Association's Quarterly Ratings: 1939 – BoxRec
 National Boxing Association's Quarterly Ratings: 1940 – BoxRec
 The Ring Magazine's Annual Ratings: Lightweight--1930s – BoxRec
 NYSAC World Lightweight Title (Boxing)
 NYSAC World Welterweight Title (Boxing)

American male boxers
African-American boxers
Native American boxers
1912 births
1988 deaths
20th-century Native Americans
American people of Irish descent
Boxers from Mississippi
Burials at Angelus-Rosedale Cemetery
Featherweight boxers
World featherweight boxing champions
World colored welterweight boxing champions
International Boxing Hall of Fame inductees
People from Columbus, Mississippi
Boxers from St. Louis
Welterweight boxers
World welterweight boxing champions
Lightweight boxers
World lightweight boxing champions
World boxing champions
American Christians
Baptists from Mississippi
20th-century African-American sportspeople
20th-century Baptist ministers from the United States